Ceromasia is a genus of flies in the family Tachinidae.

Species
C. auricaudata Townsend, 1908
C. hybreas (Walker, 1849)
C. rubrifrons (Macquart, 1834)

References

Tachinidae genera
Exoristinae
Taxa named by Camillo Rondani